Killing Castro may refer to:
 Castro's Beard, a play by Brian Stewart, renamed Killing Castro
 Killing Castro (comics), a 2015 graphic novel